Italian protectorate of Albania may refer to:

Italian protectorate over Albania, existing during and after WW1
Italian protectorate of Albania (1939–1943), existing before and during WW2

See also
German occupation of Albania